Kut-e Abdollah Rural District is a rural district (dehestan) in the Central District of Karun County, Khuzestan Province, Iran. At the 2006 census, its population was 17,353, in 3,221 families.  The rural district has 15 villages.

References 

Rural Districts of Khuzestan Province
Karun County